José Miguel Pascual Negrete Novoa, commonly known as Miguel Negrete was a 19th-century Mexican Major General. He participated in the many Mexican Civil Wars, as well as the Mexican–American War and the Second French intervention in Mexico. Negrete was also the Governor of Puebla from October 13, 1863, to November 4, 1863, and the Minister of War and Navy of Mexico from March 16, 1864, to August 23, 1865

Mexican–American War and Ayutla Revolution
He was the son of Cayetano Negrete and Aparicia Novoa. Miguel Negrete fought against the Americans during the Mexican–American War. In 1855 he took up arms in Zamora, Michoacán, during the Ayutla Revolution in support of the liberal forces with the aim of overthrowing the dictatorship of Antonio López de Santa Anna and was promoted to colonel after these conflicts.

Reform War
After the pronouncement of Félix Zuloaga's Plan de Tacubaya against the government of Ignacio Comonfort and the Federal Constitution of 1857, Negrete decided to join Zuloaga's faction, militating in these forces and embracing the ideals of the conservatives during the Reform War.

At the end of December 1857, the period of pronouncements against the conservative troops begins. With this, Miguel Negrete, after arriving in Santa Ana Chiautempan, Tlaxcala, showed himself in favor of the Constitution, putting it back into force in the state of Tlaxcala, taking the state capital and, immediately afterwards, attackingPuebla City.

In April 1858 he switched sides again, this time with the Conservatives, and was therefore promoted to the rank of General at the behest of the Conservative General Miguel Miramón.

He participated together with Leonardo Márquez and José Joaquín Ayesterán on December 22, 1860, in the Battle of Calpulalpan. He was defeated by liberal troops commanded by Jesús González Ortega in the plains of Calpulalpan, State of Mexico. He retired to private life thanks to an amnesty offered by the Juárez government.

French intervention
During the Second French Intervention in Mexico, Negrete put aside his conservative ideology and participated in the defense of Mexican territory. Before the advance of the French troops towards the center of Mexico, Negrete reacted and sided with the liberal side with his famous phrase Yo tengo Patria antes que Partido, ("I have a country before a party").

Negrete joined the republican army and under the orders of General Ignacio Zaragoza, both covered themselves with glory in the Battle of Las Cumbres and the Battle of Puebla, coming to be considered as the second hero of said battle by defending Fort Loreto. Regarding this, Ernesto de la Torre comments:

Around 1863, and being governor of the State of Puebla, before the advance of the French troops, he and Jesús González Ortega were entrusted with the defense of the Siege of Puebla. He was then captured by the French along with Jesús González Ortega, Felipe Berriozábal and Porfirio Díaz. All of them would be captured on the way to Veracruz and, after that, taken prisoners to France but Negrete managed to escape. Placed under Benito Juárez, he was Minister of War and Navy of Mexico from March 1864 to August 1865. He took part in the capture of the cities of Monterey and Saltillo.

Restored Republic
After the French intervention, he came to revolt against Juarez on two occasions, in which he was repelled and brought to order. The first was to support Julio Chávez López in Texcoco who had launched the Manifesto in Chalco to all the oppressed and poor of Mexico and the universe . Negrete managed to take the forts of Loreto and Guadalupe, but was soon apprehended and sentenced to death. General Porfirio Díaz granted him his pardon for his past participation in the battle and in the Siege of Puebla.

In 1872 he supported the Plan de la Noria against the government of Juárez under the slogan "No re-election". Due to the unexpected death of Juárez, Sebastián Lerdo de Tejada assumed the presidency and the Noria rebellion halted afterwards.

Porfiriato
In 1879, during the Porfiriato, Negrete published a manifesto addressed to the nation, criticizing and accusing Porfirio Díaz of betraying the Constitution of 1857.

He took up arms against President Porfirio Díaz in the states of Querétaro, Guanajuato and San Luis Potosí. He joined the Sierra Gorda socialist plan but was again defeated. He decided to retire to private life.

He died on January 5, 1897, in Mexico City and his remains were transferred to the Rotunda of Illustrious Persons on May 5, 1948. On December 5, 2007, in the Plenary Hall of the Legislative Assembly of the Congress of Puebla, the name of the general poblano "Miguel Negrete" was written in gold letters.

References

1827 births
1865 deaths
Independent Mexico
Liberalism in Mexico
Conservatism in Mexico
Mexican generals
Military personnel from Puebla
Politicians from Puebla
Second French intervention in Mexico
19th-century Mexican military personnel
19th-century Mexican politicians
Governors of Puebla